Jugtown, Alabama may refer to:
 Gardendale, Alabama, formerly known as Jugtown
 Sterrett, Alabama, also known as Jugtown